The Ramna Batamul bombing was a series of bomb attacks on 14 April 2001 at a cultural programme of the Pahela Baishakh celebrations arranged by Chaayanot, the leading cultural organization of Bangladesh.

Ten people, including Shujan, a Harkat-ul-Jihad al-Islami militant, died and many more people were wounded. The Islamic fundamentalist group Harkat-ul-Jihad al-Islami later confessed their involvement in the attack.

Attacks
Pohela Boishakh or Bengali New Year is the first day of the Bengali calendar. It is celebrated on 14 April in Bangladesh and 15 April in the Indian states of West Bengal as well as Tripura by the Bengali people and by minor Bengali communities in other Indian states, including Assam, Jharkhand and Odisha. On April 14 around 8:00am at Ramna Batamul, the first bomb exploded. Shortly after, there was a second blast when police were conducting evacuations and rescue operations. One policeman was injured in the second bomb explosion. Ten people lost their lives and about 50 were injured. Police also recovered another inactive bomb later. The state-owned television station BTV was broadcasting the programme live from Ramna Batamul. Because of this, people throughout the country saw the bombing attack on television.
Following the incident, all cultural functions organised for New Year celebrations were postponed.

Trial
Two charges were filed by the police with the capital's Ramna police station: one for murder and one for illegal possession of explosives. Eight years after the bomb attack, a court in Dhaka brought charges against Mufti Hannan, chief of banned fundamentalist group Harkat-ul-Jihad al-Islami and 13 others of this group. In 2014, eight of the accused were sentenced to death. Those sentenced included Mufti Hannan, Maulana Akbar Hossain, Arif Hasan Sumon, Maulana Tajuddin, Hafiz Jahangir Alam Badr, Maulana Abu Bakr alias Hafiz Selim Hawladar, Maulana Abdul Hai and Maulana Shafiqur Rahman. The other six, Shahadatullah Jewel, Maulana Sabbir, Shaokat Hossain alias Sheikh Farid, Maulana Abdur Rauf, Maulana Abu Taher and Maulana Yahia, were sentenced to life in prison.

Reactions
 The Daily Star in an editorial wrote "This was an attack against the very identity of the nation; it was a blow against the very belief on which the War of Liberation was fought; it was a stab at the very ethos in which we take immense pride, both collectively and as individuals".

References

2001 murders in Bangladesh
History of Bangladesh (1971–present)
Terrorist incidents in Bangladesh in 2001
Islamic terrorist incidents in 2001
Suicide bombings in Bangladesh
Mass murder in 2001
Crime in Dhaka
Terrorism in Bangladesh
Attacks during the New Year celebrations